In Aztec mythology Huitztlampaehecatl is the god of the South wind. His brothers are Cihuatecayotl, Tlalocayotl, and Mictlanpachecatl, who personify the winds from the west, east, and north respectively.

See also 
 Notos
 Auster

Notes 

Aztec gods
Wind deities